Preserved Fish (July 14, 1766 – July 23, 1846) was a prominent New York City shipping merchant in the early 19th century.  He was also an early broker of the New York Stock & Exchange Board.

Early life
Preserved Fish was born in Freetown, Massachusetts, to blacksmith Isaac Fish and Ruth Grinnell Fish. His extended family, prominent in New York, also gave rise to Hamilton Fish, governor, senator, and secretary of state, and Stuyvesant Fish.  He was descended from Thomas Fish, who settled in New England in 1643. There were at least 10 other Fish family members with the Quaker name "Preserved," and their lineages are often confused for one another.  The name "Preserved" is pronounced with three syllables: "pre-SER-ved" or "pre-ZUR-ved"; it refers to being "preserved (saved) from sin".

As a youth, the younger Preserved Fish shipped to the Pacific on a whaler, becoming its captain at the age of 21. He soon realized that fortune lay in selling whale oil, not in harvesting it.

Career
He prospered as a merchant in New Bedford, Massachusetts, but had a political squabble and left for New York.  He, along with Joseph Grinnell, controlled a potent shipping firm named Fish & Grinnell – later Grinnell, Minturn & Company – which had its beginnings in his efforts to expand his whale oil market.  In 1812, he became a director of Bank of America, founded after the charter of the First Bank of the United States was not renewed.  He also was one of the 28 brokers of the New York Exchange Board, which later became the New York Stock Exchange.

After his resignation from Fish & Grinnell and a brief retirement from business, he served from 1836 to his death as President of the Tradesman's Bank as well as president of the Bank of America, which was unrelated to the current institution of that name.  He was also involved with Tammany Hall: along with Gideon Lee, another banker, his faction controlled the Democratic Party in New York City at the time that the Locofoco reformers attempted, unsuccessfully, to take it over.  He was one of the leaders in the movement opposed to sabbatarianism in the United States.

Personal life
Fish was married three times. His first wife, Abigail Clark Fish, died in New Bedford, giving birth to a child who did not live.  His second wife, Mary Polly Fish (Gerrish), died in New York City.  He married his third wife, Mary Shepherd Fish, just four months later.

None of Fish's children survived, however, he had an adopted son named William Fish who reportedly died before his father did, "a disgraced man."  William had one child who was in line to inherit most of Fish's property, on the condition that "the youth must renounce his mother on arriving at the age of twenty-one."

In later life, Fish was a member of the Episcopal Church.  He died on July 23, 1846, in New York.  He is buried in the New York City Marble Cemetery. His obituary called him "a rough, obstinate, and eccentric man" but said he was "without guile" and "charitable", as well as a faithful friend.

References

External links

New York Public Library Digital Gallery

1766 births
1846 deaths
American bankers
American people in whaling
American businesspeople in shipping
Preserved
Burials at New York City Marble Cemetery
American merchants
People from Portsmouth, Rhode Island
New York (state) Democrats